Victoria Ashley Moors OLY (born November 5, 1996) is a retired Canadian artistic gymnast who represented her country at the 2012 Summer Olympics. She is the older sister of 2020 Olympic gymnast Brooklyn Moors.

Junior career

2010 
In December, Moors competed at Elite Canada in Gatineau, Quebec. She won the all-around competition with a score of 53.100.  In event finals, Moors placed first on vault, scoring 13.450; first on uneven bars, scoring 13.400; and first on floor, scoring 15.250.

2011 
In May, Moors won the all-around title at the Canadian Championships in Charlottetown, Prince Edward Island, with a score of 56.925.  In event finals, she placed third on vault, scoring 13.625; first on uneven bars, scoring 13.925; and first on floor, scoring 15.425.

Moors left the Cambridge Kips gymnastics club to move to Dynamo Gymnastics, a new club opened by her longtime coach, Elvira Saadi.

Senior career

2012 
In January, Moors competed at the London Prepares series, where Canada placed second and qualified a full team to the 2012 Summer Olympics.  She contributed an all-around score of 54.282 and placed second in the floor final with a score of 14.200.

In February, Moors competed at Elite Canada in Mississauga, Ontario. She placed third in the all-around competition with a score of 55.050, third in the uneven bars final with a score of 13.300, and first in the floor final with a score of 14.650.

At the beginning of March, Moors placed fourth at the American Cup in New York City with an all-around score of 56.365.

Later in March, Moors competed at the Pacific Rim Championships in Everett, Washington. She contributed to the Canadian team's bronze medal with an all-around score of 54.850. Individually, she placed sixth in the floor final with a score of 13.250.

In April, Moors won the silver medal in the floor final at the Artistic Gymnastics World Cup in Zibo, China, with a score of 14.025.

In May, Moors competed at the Canadian Championships in Regina, Saskatchewan. She tied for the silver medal in the all-around competition with a score of 56.300. In event finals, Moors placed second on uneven bars, scoring 13.650, and first on floor, scoring 14.600.

That summer, Moors hoped to be chosen as part of the five-member team that would represent Canada at the 2012 Summer Olympics.  After she helped Canada qualify a full team in January, Moors said, "I never really thought about it. Now, I have my mind set and I'm motivated to get to the Olympics. I really want to go."

At the end of June, Moors was one of the twelve gymnasts chosen to compete at the Final Olympic Selection meet in Gatineau, Quebec.  On the first day of competition, she placed second in the all-around with a score of 55.000. Based on her performances here and at the Canadian Championships, she was selected to the five-member Olympic team. Moors said, "I’m just so excited to be going to the Olympics. I’ve been doing my floor routine for several years, and it’s just a case of practice makes perfect. I’m still working to make it better."

London Olympics 
At the end of July, Moors competed at the 2012 Summer Olympics in London, United Kingdom. She contributed scores of 13.700 on uneven bars and 14.600 on floor toward the Canadian team's fifth-place finish.  Moors said, "Our goal was to just finish top eight. But coming to the Olympics and finishing fifth, we weren’t expecting that. It’s unreal right now. We upset a lot of big countries. We definitely raised the bar for Canada; we’re leaving a trail for the next people, and for Rio. We just decided to go out there and go strong."

2013
In March, Moors competed for Canada in the FIG World Cup event in Worcester, Massachusetts, known as the American Cup. She got the highest score among the women on the floor during competition with a score of 14.600 and won the bronze medal behind American gymnasts Katelyn Ohashi and Simone Biles with an all-around score of 57.066. In August, Moors was the first female gymnast to perform a double-twisting double layout in international competition during her floor exercise routine at the Pan American Senior Apparatus Championship. At the 2013 World Artistic Gymnastics Championships in October, she finished 10th in the all-around.

The double-twisting double layout skill on floor exercise is now called the "Moors" in the Code of Points. It is currently the only "I" skill in the code of points and has a difficulty of 0.9.  Since Moors debuted the skill, it has only been successfully competed by five other gymnasts – Brit Amy Tinkler and Americans MyKayla Skinner, Jade Carey, Simone Biles, and Morgan Hurd.

2014
In January, Moors was announced as a competitor for the 2014 American Cup (Greensboro, North Carolina) in early March. Then, in early February, she was announced as a competitor for the Tokyo World Cup in April.

In February, Moors competed at Elite Canada in Gatineau, Quebec. She won the all-around competition with a total score of 56.250 and qualified for the bars final, where she scored 13.225 and tied for the fourth place with Victoria-Kayen Woo, and for the beam final, where she scored 10.850 and came seventh. She also qualified for the floor final, but she didn't compete.

2015 
On 31 May 2015, Victoria announced her retirement from the sport via an Instagram post

Eponymous skills
Moors has two eponymous skills listed in the Code of Points.

Competitive History

References

 http://gym-score-depot.ca/elite_canada_2014/

External links
 
 Victoria Moors at Fédération Internationale de Gymnastique
 Victoria Moors at Gymnastics Canada
 Moors(Floor Exercise)

1996 births
Canadian female artistic gymnasts
Gymnasts at the 2012 Summer Olympics
Living people
Olympic gymnasts of Canada
Originators of elements in artistic gymnastics
Sportspeople from Surrey, British Columbia
Sportspeople from Cambridge, Ontario
20th-century Canadian women
21st-century Canadian women